Pinggu District, formerly Pinggu County, lies in the far east of Beijing Municipality. The district is subdivided into 2 subdistricts, 14 towns, and 2 townships. It borders the Beijing districts of Miyun and Shunyi to the north and west, respectively, Tianjin's Jizhou District to the southeast, and in Hebei province, Xinglong County and Sanhe to the northeast and south, respectively.

Administrative divisions
There are 2 subdistricts, 14 towns with 4 towns of which carry the "area" label, and 2 townships in the district:

Climate

History
Pinggu District was formerly Pinggu County until 2001. In 1986, the 10,000-capacity Pinggu Stadium, which is used mostly for football matches, opened.

Economy
Pinggu district prides itself on the cultivation of the peach.

Transportation
The planned Pinggu line will connect the District to the Beijing Subway system.

Education

Sister cities
 Dongjak-gu, Seoul, South Korea (1995) 
 Llíria, Valencia, Spain (2018)

References

External links 

 Official website of Pinggu District Government

 
Districts of Beijing